Silver Trails is a 1948 American Western film, directed by Christy Cabanne. It stars Jimmy Wakely, Dub Taylor, and Christine Larson, and was released on August 28, 1948. The film starred Whip Wilson (uncredited as the sheriff), who later went on to have a career as a famous Western film star.

Cast list
 Jimmy Wakely as Jimmy Wakely
 Dub Taylor as Cannonball (credited as "Cannonball" Taylor)
 Christine Larson as Diane Chambers
 George Lewis as José
 George Meeker as Willard Jackson
 Pierce Lyden as Ramsay
 William Norton Bailey as John Chambers
 Connie Asins as Conchita
 Fred L. Edwards as Sturgis
 Robert Strange as Don Esteban
 Whip Wilson (uncredited) as sheriff

References

External links 
 
 
 

Monogram Pictures films
1948 Western (genre) films
1948 films
American Western (genre) films
Films directed by Christy Cabanne
American black-and-white films
1940s American films